The Australia and New Zealand Banking Group Limited (ANZ) is an Australian multinational banking and financial services company headquartered in Melbourne, Victoria. It is Australia's second-largest bank by assets and fourth-largest bank by market capitalisation.

Its current corporate entity was established on 1 October 1970, when the Australia and New Zealand Bank (ANZ) merged with the English, Scottish & Australian Bank (ES&A). It was the largest bank merger in Australian history at the time. The Australia and New Zealand Bank had in turn been founded in 1951 as a merger of the Bank of Australasia and the Union Bank of Australia, which were established in 1835 and 1837 respectively. ANZ is one of the Big Four Australian banks, along with the Commonwealth Bank, NAB and Westpac.

Australian operations make up the largest part of ANZ's business, with commercial and retail banking dominating. ANZ is also the largest bank in New Zealand, where the legal entity became known as ANZ National Bank in 2003 and changed to ANZ Bank New Zealand in 2012. From 2003 to 2012, it operated two brands in New Zealand, ANZ and the National Bank of New Zealand. The National Bank brand was retired in 2012, with a number of branches closing and others converting to ANZ branches. In addition to operations throughout Australia and New Zealand, ANZ also operates in 34 other countries.

ANZ together with its subsidiaries has a workforce of 51,000 employees and serves around nine million customers worldwide.

History

19th century

The Bank of Australasia was founded in London in 1835. It combined with the Cornwall Bank, which was formed in Launceston, Van Diemens Land in 1828. In 1837, Union Bank of Australia was established in London by a group of people including George Fife Angas, a banker and slaveholder. In 1852, The English, Scottish and Australian Bank (ES&A) established in London, and opened its first Australian branch in Sydney in 1853. The ES&A bank took over the Commercial Bank of Tasmania and the London Bank of Australia in 1921 and the Royal Bank of Australia in 1927.

20th century

In 1951, the Bank of Australasia merged with Union Bank of Australia to form the Australia and New Zealand Bank (ANZ Bank). In 1963, the first computer systems established in new data processing centre in Melbourne, Australia. In 1966, ANZ began operations in Honiara, Solomon Islands. In 1968, ANZ opened an office in New York, USA. In 1969, ANZ established a representative office in Tokyo, Japan.

On 1 October 1970, ANZ merged with the English, Scottish and Australian Bank to form the present organisation, Australia and New Zealand Banking Group. That same year, the bank began operating in Vanuatu. In 1976, ANZ (PNG) was established. In 1977, ANZ transferred its incorporation from the UK to Australia. In 1979, ANZ acquired the Bank of Adelaide.

In 1980, the Singapore and New York representative offices upgraded to branch status. In 1984, ANZ purchased Grindlays Bank. In 1985, ANZ acquired Barclays’ operations in Fiji and Vanuatu. That same year, the bank received a full commercial banking licence and opened a branch in Frankfurt, Germany, and announced ANZ Singapore. In 1988, ANZ opened branches in Rarotonga, Cook Islands and Paris, France. In 1989, ANZ purchased PostBank from New Zealand Government.

During the 1990s, the Australia and New Zealand Banking Group acquired several banks. In 1990, this included National Mutual Royal Bank in March and the Town and Country Building Society in Western Australia in July. That same year, ANZ purchased Lloyd Bank's operations in Papua New Guinea and the Bank of New Zealand's operations in Fiji.

In 1993, ANZ established new headquarters in Melbourne, Australia. They also opened new branches in Hanoi, Vietnam, and Shanghai, China, and began a joint venture with PT Panin Bank in Indonesia. That year they also began operating in Tonga and sold their Canadian operations acquired via the purchase of Grindlays Bank in 1984 to HSBC Bank Canada.

Throughout the late 1990s, ANZ opened new branches in several locations, including Manila, Philippines, and Ho Chi Minh City, Vietnam. In 1997, John McFarlane was appointed Chief Executive Officer and the bank opened its Beijing branch. In 1999, ANZ formed a strategic alliance with E*Trade Australia for online share trading and purchased Amerika Samoa Bank.

21st century
In 2000, ANZ sold its Grindlays businesses in the Middle East and South Asia, and associated Grindlays Private Banking business to Standard Chartered. In 2001, ANZ opened branches in Timor Leste and began offering credit card services in Hong Kong. In 2002, ANZ formed a joint venture with ING Group for wealth management and life insurance business in Australia and New Zealand. The next year, ANZ acquired the National Bank of New Zealand.

In 2005, ANZ established the ANZ Royal Bank in Cambodia, a joint venture with the Cambodian-based Royal Group company. In 2006, ANZ announced a new world headquarters in the Melbourne Docklands and invested in the Bank of Tianjin, China. In 2007, ANZ acquired E*Trade Australia and Citizen Securities Bank in Guam. Also in 2007, Mike Smith, formerly of HSBC, became CEO after the retirement of John McFarlane in October and the company took over the naming rights sponsorship for Sydney's Stadium Australia.

In August 2009, ANZ purchased the Royal Bank of Scotland's (RBS) operations in six Asian countries for $550 million. In September the company announced it would buy out ING Group's 51% stake of the joint venture, giving ANZ 100% control of ING Australia. In November, ANZ opened their new headquarters in Melbourne.

In 2010, ANZ acquired the RBS' interests in Hong Kong, Taiwan, Singapore and Indonesia. That year ANZ also expanded its stake in the Bank of Tianjin. In November, ING Australia was renamed OnePath.

In 2012, ANZ announced the retirement of the National Bank brand in New Zealand. In 2013, ANZ became the first bank to reopen in the Christchurch CBD following the 2011 earthquakes.

In 2016, Shayne Elliott became CEO. In April ANZ partnered with Apple to bring Apple Pay to its customers. In 2017, ANZ acquired REALas property price predictor start-up.

In 2018, the Royal Commission into Misconduct in the Banking, Superannuation and Financial Services Industry heard that ANZ had failed to accurately verify the living expenses of home loan customers referred to the bank by mortgage brokers, believing that this was the responsibility of the brokers, in spite of a conflict of interest in doing so; and that, due to processing issues, it had charged nearly 500,000 home loan customers the incorrect interest rate for more than ten years, leading the bank to overcharge customers by approximately $90 million.

Bloomberg Intelligence estimated in May 2020 that ANZ's surplus capital was A$3.4 billion (US$2.4 billion), with ANZ CEO Shayne Elliott telling Bloomberg that the bank was "sitting on" the excess while it considered market trends.

In February 2020, the Federal Court of Australia fined ANZ AUD10 million for charging customers fees between 2003 and 2015 that it was not entitled to, equating to profits of around AUD3.1 million. The regulator said around 69,000 customers had been affected. For the year ending September 2020, ANZ posted a yearly profit of A$3.58 billion (US$2.53 billion), a decline of 40% from the A$6 billion in 2019, with the bank attributing the drop to the Covid-19 pandemic and "full year credit impairment charges" of A$2.74 billion as a result. 

After tensions between China and Australia resulted in China imposing trade curbs on imports from Australia in October 2020, the CEO of ANZ stated to CNBC that the company was also "looking for opportunities" in other Asian countries beyond China as well. It was reported in March 2021 that ANZ was planning to cut its workforce in China by half, and shift the positions elsewhere. In November 2021, Reuters reported that ANZ was being sued by a law firm in a class action lawsuit for unfair contract terms, after ANZ allegedly charged interest on customer purchases that had been repaid on time. The lawsuit focused on charges levied prior to January 2019, when an Australian law outlawing charging retrospective interest had been implemented. In December 2021, ANZ pled guilty in a case filed by the Australian Securities & Investments Commission to breaching its obligations as a financial services and credit licensee provider, and not fully disbursing benefits to 500,000 customers. An A$25 million penalty was proposed.

ANZ said it was combining its digital division and its Australian retail business in February 2022. In April 2022, ANZ was involved in a joint venture with Scentre Group, Westpac, IBM and the Commonwealth Bank named Lygon, a blockchain startup. The deal, which is subject to regulatory approval, is expected to take over 12 months to complete.

Executive leadership

Chief Executives
The following individuals have been appointed to serve as chief executive:

Australia and New Zealand Bank Limited, 1951–1970

Australia and New Zealand Banking Group, since 1970

Chairs of the Board
The following individuals have been appointed to serve as chairman of the board:

Australia and New Zealand Bank Limited, 1951–1969

Australia and New Zealand Banking Group, since 1969

Organisational structure
 Australia
 Retail Products
 Retail Distribution
 Commercial Banking
 Wealth (including ETrade in Australia and OnePath)
ANZ Bank New Zealand
ANZ Bank
Bonus Bonds
 Institutional Banking
Institutional banking
Corporate Finance
Working Capital
 Corporate banking
 Economics@ANZ
 Asia and Pacific
ANZ Amerika Samoa Bank
ANZ Fiji
ANZ Royal Bank
International Partnerships

Operations

Personal banking 
Personal banking is one of the largest divisions within ANZ. It provides financial services including banking and lending products to the general public. ANZ serves around six million customers at over 570 branches in Australia.

ANZ was the first bank in Australia to offer Apple Pay to its customers.

Institutional banking 
ANZ is the largest institutional bank in Australia. It provides financial services to institutional and corporate customers in Australia and the Asia-Pacific. As of 2019, ANZ has around 7,000 institutional and corporate customers, with a total lending of A$165 billion.

ANZ is committed to sustainable finance for institutional customers transitioning to a low-carbon economy. As of 2021, ANZ has concluded around A$22 billion worth of sustainable finance transactions. In June 2021, ANZ closed Australia's first sustainability-linked bond (SLB) in the domestic debt market. In August 2021, ANZ launched sustainability-linked derivatives (SLD) in Australia, Hong Kong, Singapore and Japan.

Asia-Pacific 

ANZ is one of the leading Australian banks in the Asia-Pacific region. It has been aggressive in its expansion into the emerging markets of China, Vietnam and Indonesia. ANZ is also a leading bank in New Zealand as well as several Pacific Island Nations where it competes in many markets with fellow Australian bank Westpac. ANZ's arm in New Zealand is operated through a subsidiary company, ANZ National Bank, from 2003 to 2012, when it changed by ANZ Bank New Zealand upon merging the ANZ and National Bank brands.

In March 2005, it formed a strategic alliance with Vietnam's Sacombank involving an acquisition of 10% of Sacombank's share capital. As part of the strategic alliance, ANZ will provide technical assistance in the areas of risk management and retail and small business banking.

ANZ has followed a similar strategy in China, where it acquired a 20% share in Tianjin City Commercial Bank in July 2006. It also negotiated a similar deal with Shanghai Rural Commercial Bank.

In August 2009, ANZ purchased RBS's retail units in Taiwan, Singapore, Indonesia and Hong Kong, as well as RBS'si banking businesses in Taiwan, the Philippines and Vietnam. It was purchased for the price of A$687 million.

As of September 2012, the company had a total of 1,337 branches worldwide.

In 2016, ANZ adopted less aggressive approach to expansion in the Asia-Pacific region after low returns. At the end of October 2016 ANZ announced the sale of its Asian retail and wealth management operations to the Development Bank of Singapore; ANZ also signalled a withdrawal from its "Asian pivot".

In 2020, as tensions between the US and China escalated, CEO Shayne Elliot acknowledged that the conflict had “raised the risk profile” of the bank's China investments, and said that the bank could further pull back from the country.

Offices 
In September 2006, plans were unveiled for ANZ's world headquarters to be located in Melbourne's Docklands precinct. The complex features a vast low rise office building, shops, car and bicycle parking facilities. The complex enables 6,500 ANZ staff to work in one integrated area. The building, located at 833 Collins Street, is the largest office complex in Australia at  net lettable area, with  gross floor area, and an accredited Six-Green Star Building. Construction commenced in late 2006 and the building opened in late 2009. Designed by HASSELL and Lend Lease Design, the building  faces the Yarra River. In 2006, it was expected that it would cost 478 million to build the new headquarters, however costed 750 million by the time it was complete in 2009. The building was one of the winners at the 2010 World Architecture Festival in the category "Interiors and Fit Out of the Year".

In 2016 ANZ announced that it would sell its former Melbourne global headquarters, located at the junction of 100 Queen Street, and 380 Collins Street, Melbourne, called Verdon Chambers and more commonly known as the Gothic Bank. The former bank building was purpose built as the head office of the English, Scottish & Australian Bank (a predecessor of the current ANZ Banking Group). The building was acquired in December 2016 by The GPT Group for 275.4 million.

The ANZ Bank Centre in Sydney includes ANZ as its major tenant. The office building was designed by Francis-Jones Morehen Thorp and was completed in April 2013.

Marketing

Advertising

In 2005, an advertisement included two famous robots: Lost in Space robot, and a Dalek from Doctor Who, although the Dalek was replaced in subsequent versions of the ad. In 2006, the company started a TV campaign with a series of ads featuring their new mascot – the Falcon, a bird trained to stop credit card thieves, illustrating the company's measures in prevention of credit card fraud.

In 2010, ANZ ran an ad campaign parodying common banking scenarios with a fictional character known as 'Barbara who lives in Bank World', a middle-aged, rude, sarcastic and unhelpful bank manager. The adverts have received acclaim for wit and humour, but also criticism for stereotyping bank managers. Barbara is portrayed by Australian comedian Genevieve Morris. In 2010, ANZ spent $195 million in Australia on advertising. In 2011, a series of ads were fronted by Simon Baker, the star of the American television show The Mentalist. According to a 2014 top 20 list of advertising spends, ANZ was in the top 20. In 2016, ANZ New Zealand had the highest spend of any bank. One third of ANZ's spend on media is said to be digital.

Sponsorship
In 2014, ANZ renewed its sponsorship with the Australian Open for a further five years. In 2015, ANZ held a campaign in sync with the Sydney Gay and Lesbian Mardi Gras.

Symbols

Logos
ANZ has had a number of different logos throughout its history. Its current logo was designed by M&C Saatchi, and was introduced in 2009 to coincide with ANZ's ambition to be a major regional bank in the Asia-Pacific. The 2009 logo introduces a stylised three-petaled lotus which represents the trinity of Australia, New Zealand and Asia; the three core markets of ANZ.

Coat of arms

Controversies

Manipulation of benchmark interest rates and other key metrics

In 2016, ANZ and 10 of its traders were named as being the subject of legal proceedings for manipulation of the benchmark inter-bank interest rates in Australia; specifically ASIC has made claims of unconscionable conduct and manipulation against ANZ. ANZ has attempted to deny the claims and says it will defend the claim in court. Formal filings of the originating process in this regards were made against ANZ on 4 March 2016. Since that time ASIC has compounded their claim against the ANZ. In a separate court appearance in November 2016 ANZ admitted to 10 instances of attempted cartel conduct regarding alleged manipulation of the Malaysian ringgit. The wider market rigging case has been reported as likely lasting into 2018.

Agriculture and child labour

ANZ has been the subject of claims that it has backed agriculture and timber companies that engage in so called 'land grabs'. In 2014, ANZ faced allegations that it funded a Cambodian sugar plantation that has involved child labour, military-backed land grabs, forced evictions and food shortages. In February 2020, ANZ reached a compensation deal to around 1,000 Cambodian families in a land dispute related to a sugar company that ANZ funded, agreeing to pay "the profit it earned from the loan to the affected communities" of an undisclosed amount.

Litigious approach

ANZ has also been criticised in the Senate for its allegedly "hard boiled" approach to farmers exposed to the fallout from ANZ's purchase of the Landmark loan book. One submission to the Senate inquiry into bank conduct mentioned one farmer self-immolating after alleged defaults occurring. Another former customer in the Senate inquiry was mentioned as being subjected to victimisation by receivers and police, including use of SWAT teams and being held at gun-point. In 2016 it was reported that ANZ was accused of racism in a high-profile court case involving the businessman Pankaj Oswal and his wife; specifically it was reported that an email contained comments stating that, "We are dealing with Indians with no moral compass and an Indian woman [the wife of Mr. Oswal], as every bit as devious as PO (Pankaj Oswal)," and "This has been a very Indian characteristic transaction." The ANZ agreed to a settlement for an undisclosed amount in respect of the legal claim made by the Oswals.

Culture

ANZ CEO Shayne Elliott admitted in 2016 that "culture" will be one of the biggest challenges for ANZ. Media reports have included allegations of sexism, drug use and bravado culture. In 2016, ANZ was pursued in court over its suggesting on social media that criticism of the bank's chief financial officer might have been sexist, which resulted in the broker at Bell Potter losing his job. Former ANZ director John Dahlsen in 2016 admitted that there are issues with bank culture and competition. In November 2016, there were further claims of sexist conduct and a separate lawsuit was filed against ANZ in the United States regarding staff at its New York office.

Malaysian scandal

In early 2016, ANZ was also mentioned in a scandal in Malaysia involving one of ANZ's subsidiaries and the Malaysian leader. The incident has raised questions for ANZ. ANZ admitted in November 2016 that it had little ability to control its affiliate.

Misleading file notes presented to Victorian Supreme Court

In 2016, there was an incident reported involving the Financial Ombudsman Service (Australia), where the Financial Ombudsman Service presented misleading file notes to the Supreme Court of Victoria, in the discovery phase of a case involving ANZ, to the benefit of ANZ's case. The ANZ has not commented on the scandal as yet.

Out-sourcing of jobs

ANZ has continued to out-source jobs in countries other than Australia and this has caused some controversy with some outlets. ANZ have been progressively increasing work output from offshore offices. ANZ's Bangalore office has been operational since 1989, making it one of the first organisations to employ IT staff based in India. ANZ employs around 4,800 staff in Bangalore, India. 1500 IT positions, 2000 positions in Payments and Institutional Operations and International and High Value Services and 1300 positions in Operations Personal Banking have been shifted from Melbourne to India. In 2006, ANZ predicted that by 2010, over 2000 jobs would have been shifted from Australia to Bangalore. In 2012, ANZ transferred 360 permanent staff from Melbourne and Bangalore to Capgemini. All these staff worked in the Technology Testing and Environment Space. As ANZ CIO Anne announced earlier that ANZ want a Hybrid model of technology in order to achieve the 2017 Technology roadmap.

Anti-competitive conduct

Despite the ANZ taking advantage of block-chain technology the ANZ had blocked businesses making use of Bitcoin. The ANZ and others were investigated by the Australian Competition and Consumer Commission and cleared of colluding with other banks on the issue of Bitcoin based business.

Alleged discrimination 
In September 2020, ANZ was accused of discrimination by Australian cryptocurrency exchanger Allan Flynn before the ACT Civil and Administrative Tribunal. The dispute is the first human rights action brought by a Bitcoin trader against a bank alleging discrimination on the basis of Flynn's "profession, trade, occupation, or calling" in violation of the Australian Capital Territory's anti-discrimination legislation. Flynn alleges ANZ denied him banking services on the basis of his occupation as a cryptocurrency exchanger by closing his and his brother's bank accounts and contacting another bank about his Bitcoin trading, allegedly causing the other bank to similarly deny him service. Interlocutory orders were made by the Tribunal in June 2021. The matter between Flynn and the bank was settled in October 2021 with ANZ admitting in a statement that had de-banked Flynn because he operated Bitcoin trading service, and that it could (subject to their defences) amount to discrimination, but that they believed doing so was necessary to mitigate exposure to regulatory risk. Flynn maintains, despite the settlement requiring him to withdraw the action, that ANZ's actions were unlawful.

Panama Papers

ANZ was reported as appearing in 7,548 of the Mossack Fonseca documents in the Panama Papers, reflecting the bank's extensive work in New Zealand, the Cook Islands, Samoa and Jersey.

Criminal cartel charges
On 1 June 2018, the Australian Competition and Consumer Commission (ACCC) announced that criminal cartel charges are expected to be laid by the Commonwealth Director of Public Prosecutions (CDPP) against ANZ Bank, its Group Treasurer Rick Moscati, along with Deutsche Bank, Citigroup and a number of individuals. The charges concern a $2.5 billion ANZ capital raising that took place in August 2015. In July 2020 committal proceedings were completed in the case, which may last into 2022.

Hayne Royal Commission

The Royal Commission into Misconduct in the Banking, Superannuation and Financial Services Industry, also known as the Hayne Royal Commission, was a Royal Commission established on 14 December 2017 by the Australian Government to inquire into and report on misconduct in the banking, superannuation, and financial services industry. The establishment of the commission followed revelations in the media of a culture of greed within several Australian financial institutions. A subsequent parliamentary inquiry recommended a royal commission, noting the lack of regulatory intervention by the relevant government authorities, and later revelations that financial institutions were involved in money laundering for drug syndicates, turned a blind eye to terrorism financing, and ignored statutory reporting responsibilities and impropriety in foreign exchange trading.

ANZ was also implicated in the bank bill swap rate scandal and settled with ASIC prior to the commencement of legal proceedings.

Defamation case
In July 2020 Bogac Ozdemir, a former employee of ANZ, filed a civil action against the bank at a New York court. Ozdemir claims that statements made by the bank about him were defamatory, and is seeking damages of US$20 million.

Document Dumping 
In 2023, confidential banking documents were found in a bin close to the ANZ branch in Armadale. The documents included names, addresses, and account numbers of customers with the branch.

See also

 ATM Industry Association (ATMIA)
 Banking in Australia
 List of banks
 List of banks in Australia
 List of banks in Oceania

References

External links 

 

 
Banks of Australia
Companies listed on the Australian Securities Exchange
Companies listed on the New Zealand Exchange
Companies based in Melbourne
Banks of New Zealand
Banks established in 1835
Australian companies established in 1835